Maya Samhita (Sanskrit:,) is a treatise on Hindu Shilpa Shastras. A certain Maya is said to have written this book along with Hora Shastra.

See also
Mamuni Mayan

References

Hindu literature